Kelly Pannek (born December 29, 1995) is an American ice hockey player with the PWHPA and the American national team.

Career
In high school, she set the state record for the quickest natural hat trick, scoring three goals in 22 seconds in a 2012 game.

Across 157 games in the NCAA, Pannek put up 186 points. In 2017, she was a Patty Kazmaier Award Finalist after scoring 62 points in 39 games and winning the national championship for the second year in a row. After taking leave for 2017-18 to train with the US Olympic team, she returned to captain the university in 2018-19.

She was drafted 4th overall by the Minnesota Whitecaps in the 2018 NWHL Draft. After graduating, she joined the PWHPA.

International
She was first invited to the senior team's development camp in December 2016. She would then participate at the 2017 IIHF Women's World Championship, as well as the 2018 and 2019 World Championships. 

She was a member of the gold-medal-winning American team at the 2018 Winter Olympics, where she picked up two assists in five games and finished in the tournament's top 10 for faceoff percentage.

On January 2, 2022, Pannek was named to Team USA's roster to represent the United States at the 2022 Winter Olympics.

Awards and honors
2016-17 AHCA-CCM Women's University Division I First-Team All-American

Personal life
Pannek attended Benilde-St. Margaret's high school, where she also played soccer, being named 2013 Minnesota Ms. Soccer.

She has a bachelor's degree in finance.

References

External links

1995 births
Living people
American women's ice hockey forwards
Ice hockey players from Michigan
Ice hockey players at the 2018 Winter Olympics
Ice hockey players at the 2022 Winter Olympics
Medalists at the 2018 Winter Olympics
Medalists at the 2022 Winter Olympics
Minnesota Golden Gophers women's ice hockey players
Olympic gold medalists for the United States in ice hockey
Olympic silver medalists for the United States in ice hockey
People from Plymouth, Michigan
Professional Women's Hockey Players Association players